The Texas Tech Red Raiders football team, representing Texas Tech University, has had 155 players drafted into the National Football League (NFL) since the league began holding drafts in 1936. This includes six players taken in the first round and one overall number one pick, Dave Parks in the 1964 NFL Draft. The Green Bay Packers and Chicago Bears have drafted the most Red Raiders, eleven and nine, respectively. The Carolina Panthers and Jacksonville Jaguars are the only current franchises to not have drafted a player from Texas Tech. Three former Red Raiders have been selected to a Pro Bowl, seven former Red Raiders have won a league championship with their respective teams, and three former Red Raiders have been selected to both a Pro Bowl and won a league championship. Only one former Red Raider, Patrick Mahomes, has gone on to win the league Most Valuable Player award.

Each NFL franchise seeks to add new players through the annual NFL Draft. The draft rules were last updated in 2009. The team with the worst record the previous year picks first, the next-worst team second, and so on. Teams that did not make the playoffs are ordered by their regular-season record with any remaining ties broken by strength of schedule. Playoff participants are sequenced after non-playoff teams, based on their round of elimination (wild card, division, conference, and Super Bowl).

Before the merger agreements in 1966, the American Football League (AFL) operated in direct competition with the NFL and held a separate draft. This led to a massive bidding war over top prospects between the two leagues. As part of the merger agreement on June 8, 1966, the two leagues would hold a multiple round "Common Draft". When the AFL officially merged with the NFL in 1970, the "Common Draft" simply became the NFL Draft.

Notably, this list does not include undrafted Texas Tech players that have played for the NFL, for example, Wes Welker.

Key

Selections

American Football League

National Football League

Notes

References
General

 
 

Specific

Texas Tech Red Raiders

NFL Draft
Texas Tech Red Raiders NFL Draft